IPC 376 is a 2021 Indian Tamil-language horror thriller film directed by Ramkumar Subbaraman and starring Nandita Swetha.

Cast 
Nandita Swetha as Yazhini
Meghana Ellen as Bharati
Mahanadhi Shankar as Perumal
Marimuthu as Arumugam
Sampath Ram
Saravana Sakthi
Raja
Madhusudhan Rao as Swamiji
Super Subbarayan as Rajasekaran
Aryan as Sebastian
Pondy Ravi
Bijili Ramesh
Robo Chandru as Murugesan

Production
The film is directed by Ramkumar Subbaraman, a former assistant of Balasekaran and Prabhu Solomon. The film is about the consequences of rape crime. The title IPC 376 is based on the Indian penal code section for rape crime. The film was planned to be made as a Tamil and Telugu language bilingual. Nandita Swetha underwent training for her role as a cop. Nandita did an underwater stunt sequence in the film. She performed the stunt sequences herself without a body double. The final schedule of shooting started in January of 2. Filming finished in March 2020.

Soundtrack
Songs by Yaadhav Ramalinkgam.
"Angali Thaye"
"Karaarana Khakki"

Release
A critic from Maalaimalar praised the performances of the cast while criticising the film's pace. A critic from nettv4u said that "Although the makers provided her [Nandita] an opportunity to play a cop and do some exciting action sequences, it didn't help much for the film's run."

References

2020s Tamil-language films
Indian horror thriller films
2021 films
Thriller films